Abies amabilis, commonly known as the Pacific silver fir, is a fir native to the Pacific Northwest of North America, occurring in the Pacific Coast Ranges and the Cascade Range. It is also commonly referred to as the white fir, red fir, lovely fir, Amabilis fir, Cascades fir, or silver fir. The species name is Latin for 'lovely'.

Description
The bark on younger trees is light grey, thin and covered with resin blisters. On older trees, it darkens and develops scales and furrows. The leaf arrangement is spiral on the shoot, but with each leaf variably twisted at the base so they lie flat to either side of and above the shoot, with none below the shoot. The shoots are orange-red with dense velvety pubescence. The winged seeds are released when the cones disintegrate at maturity about 6–7 months after pollination.

The tree can live to over 400 years old.

Distribution and ecology 
The species is native to the Pacific Northwest of North America, occurring in the Pacific Coast Ranges and the Cascade Range from the extreme southeast of Alaska, through western British Columbia, Washington and Oregon, to the extreme northwest of California.

It is always found in temperate rainforests with relatively high precipitation and cool, humid summers. Growing in dense stands, it prospers in shade and snow. Common associate trees are western hemlock in northern ranges, Douglas-fir in central areas, and California buckeye in the extreme southern area of its range. Western hemlock is equally shade tolerant, but Pacific silver fir saplings are more resilient of ground obstacles. Though its thin bark makes it susceptible to fire, the slow-growing saplings succeed less shade-tolerant species. It survives well at high elevation, but eventually succumbs to root or heart rot, in addition to diseases and insects such as Adelges piceae.

Uses 
Native Americans utilized the species for medicinal purposes. After David Douglas discovered it in 1825, he brought seeds to England for cultivation.

The wood is soft and not very strong; it is used for paper making, packing crates and other cheap construction work. The lumber is often paired with that of western hemlock. The foliage has an attractive scent and is sometimes used for Christmas decoration, including Christmas trees.

It is also planted as an ornamental tree in large parks, though its requirement for cool, humid summers limits the areas where it grows well; successful growth away from its native range is restricted to areas like western Scotland and southern New Zealand.

References

amabilis
Trees of Western Canada
Trees of the Western United States
Plants described in 1839
Ornamental trees